IFRB is the acronym for:

The International Frequency Registration Board, a former organ of the International Telecommunication Union, whose responsibilities have been taken over by the Radio Regulations Board (RRB) and the Radiocommunication Bureau (BR).
You may have mis-typed IRFB, the International Rugby Football Board, the predecessor to the International Rugby Board.